Megino-Kangalassky District (Meŋe Xaŋalas uluuha) is an administrative and municipal district (raion, or ulus), one of the thirty-four in the Sakha Republic, Russia. It is located in the central part of the republic, on the Lena River opposite Yakutsk, the capital of the republic. Its administrative center is the rural locality (a selo) of Mayya. As of the 2010 Census, the total population of the district was 31,278, with the population of Mayya accounting for 23,.3% of that number.

Geography
The district borders Ust-Aldansky District in the north, Churapchinsky District in the east, Amginsky District in the southeast, Khangalassky District in the southwest, and is bounded by the Lena River in the west. The main rivers are the Tamma, Myla and Suola.
The famous Mount Suullar Myraan is located in the district, by the Suola River bank.

History
The district was established on February 10, 1930 through the merger of Meginsky and Vostochno-Kangalassky Districts.

Administrative and municipal status
Within the framework of administrative divisions, Megino-Kangalassky District is one of the thirty-four in the republic. It is divided into one settlement (an administrative division with the administrative center in the urban-type settlement (inhabited locality) of Nizhny Bestyakh) and twenty-nine rural okrugs (naslegs), all of which comprise thirty-five rural localities. The selo of Mayya serves as its administrative center.

As a municipal division, the district is incorporated as Megino-Kangalassky Municipal District. The Settlement of Nizhny Bestyakh is incorporated into an urban settlement, and the twenty-nine rural okrugs are incorporated into thirty rural settlements within the municipal district. The urban-type settlement of Nizhny Bestyakh serves as the administrative center of the municipal district.

Inhabited localities

Demographics

The population of the district is predominantly made up of ethnic Yakuts, who represented 91% of the inhabitants in the 2002 Census. Russians accounted for a further 6.4% of the population, with smaller numbers of Ukrainians and Evenks.

See also 
 Lena Plateau
 Uorullubut kus, a western and central forest

References

Notes

Sources
Official website of the Sakha Republic. Registry of the Administrative-Territorial Divisions of the Sakha Republic. Megino-Kangalassky District. 

Districts of the Sakha Republic